The Emmetsburg team was a minor league baseball team based in Emmetsburg, Iowa. Emmetsburg played the 1912 season as members of the Independent level Iowa State League, placing 4th in their only season of minor league play. Emmetsburg hosted minor league home games at Harrison Park.

History
Emmetsburg, Iowa gained a minor league baseball team in 1912. The Emmetsburg team was a charter member of the 1912 Iowa State League, which had reformed as a five–team Independent level league. Other members joining Emmetsburg in the 1912 Iowa State League were Clear Lake Fish Eaters, Estherville, Iowa. Fort Dodge Boosters and Mason City Cementmakers.

Beginning play on May 23, 1912, with home games at Harrison Park, Emmetsburg finished the 1912 season with a 24–38 record, placing 4th in the Iowa State League final standings under manager Ed Smithson. The Clear Lake Fish Eaters team folded on July 12, with an 11–24 record, before the completion of the regular season, leaving the league with four teams.

In the overall final regular season standings, Emmetsburg finished 12.5 games behind the 1st place Mason City Cementmakers (38–27) and followed the Fort Dodge Boosters (34–25) and Estherville (28–22). The Iowa State League played a split season schedule, with the winners of each half meeting in a playoff. Estherville defeated Fort Dodge in the Finals to capture the championship. The Iowa State League folded permanently after the 1912 season.

Emmetsburg has not hosted another minor league team.

The ballpark
Emmetsburg played home games at Harrison Park. Harrison Park is still in use today and is located at Main Street & Call Street in Emmetsburg, Iowa.

Year–by–year Record

Notable alumni
Exact roster information for the 1912 Emmetsburg team is unknown.

References

External links
Baseball Reference

Defunct minor league baseball teams
Professional baseball teams in Iowa
Defunct baseball teams in Iowa
Baseball teams established in 1912
Baseball teams disestablished in 1912
Iowa State League teams
Palo Alto County, Iowa